Nebularia baerorum is a species of sea snail, a marine gastropod mollusc in the family Mitridae.

Distribution
This marine species occurs off the Philippines.

Original description
 (of Mitra baerorum Poppe & Tagaro, 2010) Poppe G. & Tagaro S. (2010) New species of Haloceratidae, Columbellidae, Buccinidae, Mitridae, Costellariidae, Amathinidae and Spondylidae from the Philippines. Visaya 3(1):73-93.

References

baerorum